Darlene Deibler Rose was a born-again Christian missionary in Papua New Guinea during and after World War II in what would later be the Western Highlands province. She was the first American woman to enter the Baliem Valley of New Guinea, working there with her first husband, the Rev. Russell C. Deibler.  After WWII broke out, the Deiblers were sent to separate prison camps. Russell died at Pare Pare in 1944, but Darlene survived four years in a camp for women at Kampili, where she developed beriberi. Her Christian faith sustained her during those years.

Her experience is documented in the autobiographical Evidence Not Seen: A Woman's Miraculous Faith in a Japanese Prison during WWII (Harper & Row, 1988), which has been optioned for a possible film.

After the war, Darlene married Jerry Rose and resumed missionary work in New Guinea.  After nearly thirty years in New Guinea, they relocated to the Australian Outback. She died on February 24, 2004.

References

External links
 Audio of Darlene Deibler Rose telling her experiences

1917 births
2004 deaths
American women civilians in World War II
Protestant missionaries in Papua New Guinea
Female Christian missionaries
American Protestant missionaries
Protestant missionaries in Australia
American prisoners of war in World War II
World War II prisoners of war held by Japan
American evangelicals
American expatriates in Papua New Guinea
American emigrants to Australia